Events in the year 1932 in China.

Incumbents
President: Lin Sen
Premier: Sun Fo until January 28, Wang Jingwei
Vice Premier: Chen Mingshu until January 29, Soong Tse-ven

Events
January 25-February 4 - Defense of Harbin
January 28-March 3 - January 28 Incident
July - ROC (as China team) competed in Olympic for the very first time
October - Ningdu Conference
Establishment of Manchukuo

 
1930s in China
Years of the 20th century in China